The Cassaro is the most ancient street of Palermo. From the late 16th century the street also had the name Via Toledo. Following the unification of Italy, it was officially renamed Via Vittorio Emanuele II, but the old and distinctive name is still in use. The street is rooted in the age of the foundation of Palermo by the Phoenicians. It provides access to a number of important sights, including the Royal Palace (also known as Palazzo dei Normanni) and the Cathedral, two UNESCO World Heritage Sites.

Toponymy 
The name "Cassaro" comes from the Arabic word "Qasr" (fortress, castle). In fact, during the era of the Islamic Sicily, Panormus, called Balarm by the Saracens, became the island's capital and a large portion of the ancient city was widely fortified. In the Middle Ages, especially during the Islamic and Norman periods, the street was also called "As-Simat Al-Balat" (Arabic) and "Via (Platea) Marmorea" (Latin) because it was paved with slabs of marble. Even now, the Arabic word "balat(a)" is used in Sicily to indicate the marble.

In the late sixteenth century, during the age of the personal union between the crowns of Spain and Sicily, the street assumed the name of "Via Toledo" in honor of the Viceroy García de Toledo Osorio, the main architect of its rectification. This denomination lasted until the unification of Italy, when the street was officially dedicated to the King Victor Emmanuel II of Italy. However, the ancient name "Cassaro" never was abandoned by the people.

History 

The road was created at the time of the foundation of Palermo by the Phoenicians, cutting  into two parts the city and connecting the ancient port to the Punic necropolis located in the area of the current Piazza Indipendenza and Corso Calatafimi.

During the Islamic era the street confirmed its role of main axis of the city, from which various branch detached as secondary roads called "Darbi", perpendicular to the main branch, inserting in the territory and ending in "Aziqqa", blind alleys distinctive of Palermo. During the Siculo-Norman age the Cassaro was richly described by the Muslim geographer Al-Idrisi in his famous "Book of Roger".

The most important innovation to the layout of the Cassaro occurred in the second half of the sixteenth century, during the Spaniard age. The project, maybe defined from the outset but accomplished in various stages, provided for the rectification and enlargement of the street up to the Church of Santa Maria di Porto Salvo, near Palazzo Chiaramonte (at that time headquarters of the Viceroy).

The works, with the permission of the Viceroy Garcia de Toledo, began in 1567. It started with the adjustment of the southern area till "Porta dei Patitelli" (current Via Roma), then with massive demolitions to reach Piazza Marina. The development of this work was actively supported by the city nobility, that contributed to the opening of Piazza Bologni and Piazza Pretoria. In 1581 The Viceroy Marcantonio Colonna prolonged the street up to the city walls by opening the sea with the monumental Porta Felice.

Structure 
The street is perfectly straight from Porta Nuova, near Piazza Indipendenza, to Porta Felice, near the Foro Italico. It has a slight downhill sloping towards the sea. Throughout its path there are many streets leading into it but only two crossing: Via Maqueda (also known as "Strada Nuova"), with which it forms the famous Baroque intersection known as Quattro Canti (Piazza Villena), and Via Roma, created in the late nineteenth century.

Transport 
Since 2015 the street is pedestrian in the stretch from the Cathedral to Quattro Canti. A free shuttle bus, called "Free Centro Storico" or "Arancione" (Orange), crosses the historic centre from Piazza Indipendenza to Porta Felice.

Places of interest

Feast of Saint Rosalia 

The Cassaro is the scenery of the long procession of the Chariot of Saint Rosalia during the "Festino", the night between the 14th and 15 July of each year. The feast dedicated to the patron saint of Palermo involves every year tens of thousands of people.

See also 
 Porta Nuova
 Via Maqueda
 Via Roma

References

External links 

 Monumental itinerary of the Cassaro - sicilytourist.com

Streets in Palermo
Tourist attractions in Palermo
History of Palermo